A mutu is a type of improvised sung poetry found in Sardinia. These are traditionally sung mostly by women in response to the male. This type of improvisation called battorinas (in English: quatrains).

Mutus consist of paired verses (in sardinian: duina), usually one slightly longer than the other (for example 3 + 4 lines). The first is known as the isterrida (opening) and the second as the torrada (response), with the torrada repeating at the argument of the isterrida.
The mutos are sung during the gara (competition) of the cantu a chiterra.

Names
The plural of mutu in Sardinian is mutos. However, they are variously also known as muttu, mutettu, repentina or ottada. The term mut(t)u prevails in the northern part of the island and is attested since the 8th century.

See also
Music of Sardinia

Bibliography
Garzia, Raffaele (1977 - 1917). Mutettus cagliaritani, Cagliari, EDES
Cirese, Alberto Mario (1977). Struttura e origine morfologica dei mutos e dei mutettus sardi ; e Alcune questioni terminologiche in materia di poesia popolare sarda: mutu, mutettu, battorina, taja, Cagliari, Edizioni 3T
Perria, Giovanni (2012). Mutetus e mutos: tipologia, struttura, funzione, provided with a CD, PTM, Mogoro

References

Genres of poetry
Song forms
Improvisation
Music in Sardinia